The FIM Enel MotoE World Championship (formerly known as the MotoE World Cup) is a class of motorcycle racing that uses only electric motorcycles. The series is sanctioned by the FIM and the inaugural season in 2019 was due to support MotoGP at five of the European circuits.

Technical specifications

The series has used the Energica Ego Corsa motorcycle since inception, manufactured by Energica Motor Company, but will change to Ducati from 2023.
	
 Motor: Synchronous oil-cooled AC with permanent magnets
 Maximum Continuous Power: 120 kW (160 hp/cv)
 Acceleration: 0-100 km/h in three seconds
 Top Speed: 270 km/h 
 Torque: 200 N•m (147.5 lb•ft) at 5,000 rpm
 Frame: Tubular steel trellis
 Weight: 258–280 kg
 Swingarm: Cast aluminium
 Brakes: Brembo package: 330mm steel discs, Nickel-plated four-piston monoblock calipers, Z04 pads and Brembo master-cylinder
 Wheels: Marchesini 7-spoke forged aluminium rims
 Throttle: Ride-by-wire
 Battery: High-voltage lithium-ion
 Recharging: 0-85 percent in about 20 minutes, via the integrated DC fast charging technology developed by CCS Combo

Seasons

2019

The inaugural season took place over 6 rounds between July and November 2019 with 12 teams fielding a grid of 18 riders. The season start was originally planned for May, but had to be postponed because of a fire at the Jerez test in March where all competition bikes were destroyed. A new schedule was announced in late March of six races at four venues starting in July. Italian rider Matteo Ferrari from the Trentino Gresini Moto E team became the first MotoE champion.

2020

The second season was contested over 7 rounds at 3 different circuits. Because of the COVID-19 pandemic the season had to be postponed until July when it started at Jerez. The season champion was Jordi Torres in his first season in the electric class, after achieving four podium finishes including one win. Runners-up Matteo Ferrari and Dominique Aegerter also tallied four podiums including two wins each, but suffered from retirements and low classifications at the remaining races.

2021

The third season was contested over seven races at six different locations. Belgian team Marc VDS withdrew from the series, citing scheduling conflicts. Seven races are scheduled for the season, starting in May in Jerez. Spanish rider Jordi Torres won the championship a second time, successfully defending his 2020 title.

2022

The fourth season was contested over twelve races at six different locations. Dominique Aegerter won the championship.

2023

The MotoE has officially gained World Championship status.

List of World Cup winners

Calendar

By race title

See also
 FIM eRoad Racing World Cup
 Electric motorsport

References

External links 
 

Electric motorcycles
Green racing
Motorcycle road racing series
Fédération Internationale de Motocyclisme
Recurring sporting events established in 2019
World cups